Carl Lorenz (27 November 1913 – 25 November 1993) was a German cyclist. He won the gold medal in Men's tandem at the 1936 Summer Olympics.

References

1913 births
1993 deaths
German male cyclists
Olympic gold medalists for Germany
Cyclists at the 1936 Summer Olympics
Olympic cyclists of Germany
Olympic medalists in cycling
People from Riesa
Cyclists from Saxony
Medalists at the 1936 Summer Olympics
German track cyclists